MNL48 (read as M.N.L. Forty-eight) is a Filipino idol girl group based in Manila, Philippines. Formed in 2018, they are the fourth international sister group of AKB48, after Indonesia's JKT48, China's SNH48 (former), and Thailand's BNK48. The group is named after Manila, the capital of the Philippines. MNL48 is the only AKB48 sister group that debuted with exactly 48 members on its First Generation.

Dubbed as "P-Pop (idol) Pioneers", MNL48 paved the way to the new era of Philippine pop idol industry and is known within the 48 Group as "Vocal Queens" for their singing ability.

History

2016–2018: Formation 
On March 26, 2016, the formations of MNL48, BNK48, and TPE48 were announced at Minami Takahashi's concert.

On October 13, 2017, Hallo Hallo Entertainment announced registration and audition tour dates for the group's first generation. The following month on November 10, Hallo Hallo Entertainment held the first audition for MNL48.

In early 2018, a segment was hosted on It's Showtime by Anne Curtis, Billy Crawford, Karylle and Jhong Hilario which determined the members of the group's first generation. It was a segment in search of the ultimate all-female Filipino idol group whose name would be derived from its base city of Manila. It conducted nationwide auditions for women aged 15–20 years old to become sought-after "idols you can meet". Thousands of women took part in the audition, with only 200 qualifying to start the 13-week challenge rounds that tested their singing and dancing skills. From the Top 200, the aspirants were reduced to a Top 75 that faced public voting until the General Election using the MNL48-Plus App developed by Hallohallo Entertainment Inc. in partnership with ABS-CBN and one of the world's top multimedia, entertainment and IT agencies, AKS. From Top 75, only 48 women became the official members of the group.

From the Top 48, there was a ranking system that followed AKB48's Senbatsu Sousenkyo concept. Top 33-48 were hailed as the Next Girls, the Top 17-32 as the Under Girls, and the Top 16 as the Senbatsu members. From the Top 16, 7 women secured the Kami 7 slots for performing as frontlining acts, joining AKB48 and all of its sister groups worldwide in concerts; the Kami 7 were also given international endorsement deals and an exclusive training program in AKS. From the Kami 7, the winner (as the Center Girl) of the general election became the face of MNL48 worldwide.

2018: First Generation, Aitakatta – Gustong Makita and Pag-ibig Fortune Cookie 
On April 22, the "Meet Your Oshimen" event was held, where three hundred lucky ticket-holding fans met and greeted their favourite MNL48 aspirants. The handshake event was held at the TriNoma at 5:00 PM on the fourth floor garden. Six days after the event, the first general election took place at Studio 4 and Center Road in ABS-CBN. Before the election on April 28, Kris (as a challenger), along with two other eligible contenders Aria and Eunice, announced their departure from the group and will resign from their candidacy for the upcoming election. A few days after the election, eight trainees Reiko, Reina, Nix, Ann, Celine, Arol, Kana, and Ikee also left the group. The newly recruited trainee Cole came in as a replacement member.

On June 3, MNL48's fan-meeting event was held at the Eton Centris Elements. The group performed the Tagalog versions of "Aitakatta", "Heavy Rotation", "Skirt Hirari", and "Sakura no Hanabiratachi" for the first time. On June 8, the members Trixie, Zen, Van,  and Mae announced their departure from the group. To fill in the spots, the kenkyuusei members Rans, Nina, and Andi were promoted as members of Team MII. Trainee Coleen is then promoted to Team NIV. For the rankings, Ella and Ash entered the Kami 7, while Alyssa and Erica joined the Senbatsu. On July 9, Nina and Vern announced their departure from MNL48, with Cassey filling Nina's position in Team MII.

On August 17, the group premiered the music video of their debut single "Aittakata – Gustong Makita". While their debut extended play Aitakatta was released on September 14, the single was released on September 28. On October 5, MNL48 were announced as one of the participants for Himig Handog 2018. The group interpreted the song "Dalawang Pag-ibig Niya" alongside Your Face Sounds Familiar Kids alumni Krystal Brimner and Sheena Belarmino. On October 26, MNL48 premiered their second music video "Talulot ng Sakura". On November 7, 18 days before the official release of the second single, trainee Sheccaniah Faith Baler planned to resign from the group since she completed her duties in the group's debut. On November 25, the group premiered the music video of their second single "Pag-ibig Fortune Cookie" the same day they performed the said single on another "Handshake Event" held on Movie Stars Cafe. On December 12, 2018, trainee Edralyn Tocop left, leaving nine trainees remaining.

On December 11, AKS announced that the group will join the "AKB48 Group Asia Festival 2019" event on January 27, 2019, at Impact Arena, Muang Thong Thani, Bangkok, Thailand after BNK48's sixth Single Senbatsu General Election. MNL48 will perform with their sister groups AKB48, JKT48, BNK48, AKB48 Team SH, AKB48 Team TP and SGO48. MNL48 members Abby, Brei, Coleen, Faith, Gabb, Jem, Mari, Rans, Sela and Sheki went to the event. On December 14, it was announced that MNL48 will be having their first mini-concert at Movie Stars Cafe, Centris Station, Quezon Ave on December 23, 2018.

On December 21, MNL48 released "Amazing Grace" music video with MNL48 Gospel unit members Sheki, Belle, Brei, Rans, Faith and Aly. The single was digitally released on December 24, 2018.

2019: Second Generation, 365 Araw ng Eroplanong Papel, Ikaw ang Melody, High Tension & Kapamilya Management 

On January 26, the group performs for the first time outside the country at the "AKB48 Group Asia Festival 2019" event on January 27, 2019, at Impact Arena, Muang Thong Thani, Bangkok, Thailand after BNK48's sixth Single Senbatsu General Election. MNL48 performed with their sister groups AKB48, JKT48, BNK48, AKB48 Team SH, AKB48 Team TP and SGO48. On February 10, they unveil the music video of the second coupling song from Pag-ibig Fortune Cookie, Palusot Ko'y Maybe as a tagalized version of AKB48's Iiwake Maybe which was performed by Team NIV and Coleen selected as the center girl of the said team's song. On February 22, MNL48 conducts a casting for second generation to take part in the upcoming General Election. On March 1, 2019, they released a third single, 365 Araw ng Eroplanong Papel. On March 25, the 20 members from the second Generation were selected. On April 6, they held their concert at the New Frontier Theater (formerly Kia Theater) near Araneta Coliseum where its tickets were confirmed sold out through their bookings and/or reservations.

Second general election 
On April 27, the group celebrates its first anniversary back-to-back with the second General Election where all 77 members over two generations competing for Top 48 spots. On the said event, the members who did not make it to Top 48 will immediately graduate from the group. 16 First Generation members (including Cassandra Mae Pestillos, Ella Mae Amat, Eunys Abad, Guinevere Muse, Hazel Joy Marzonia, Jessel Montaos, Khyan Jewel Cacapit, Madelaine Epilogo, Necca Adelan, Princess Erica Sanico, Princess Rius Briquillo, Sharei Engbino, Edelvira Bandong, Jamela Magbanlac, Polaris Yna Salazar, Ruth Carla Dela Paz) and 13 Second Generation members (including Abbigail Shaine Reyes, Alexie Iris Dimaayo, Alyssandra Corteza, Anne Nicole Casitas, Christina Samantha Tagana, Chrisylle Joy Mondejar, Francese Therese Pinlac, Missy Ainza, Naomi Roniele De Guzman, Je-ann Benette Guinto, Karla Jane Tolentino, Shay Anne Enciso, Trisha Labrador) were eliminated in the Second General Election with the 12 remaining trainees (5 from first generation & 7 from second generation) as the replacement of 12 first generation promoted members who outranked in the said event. Team NIV's Jhona Alyannah Padillo hailed as Shekinah Arzaga's successor as the "Center Girl" of the group. On May 1, MNL48 held an annual graduation event for 29 outranked members in the Second General Election (which consists of 12 first generation members, 4 first generation trainees and 13 second generation trainees) at Movie Stars Cafe at Quezon City to showcase their talents for one last time.

To fill-in the 12 empty spots from Top 48, 6 trainees were promoted to Team MII, 3 to Team NIV and 3 to Team L. Cole, Yzabel, Emz, Jamie, Klaire & Laney were promoted to Team MII, Dani, Rowee and Miho were promoted to Team NIV and Amy, Yssa & Ice were promoted to Team L.

On May 23, 2019, Quincy Josiah Santillan a member of Team L confirmed her resignation from the group, she was replaced by Ella Mae Amat, a First Generation returning member. The following month, Sayaka Awane of Team MII announced her graduation in their Interaction Live on June 3, she is the member who left the group after the Second General Election after Santillan. Sayaka formally left the group after her final performance on June 9 at the Movie Stars Cafe, she was then replaced by Princess Rius Briquillo, a First Generation returning member.

Ikaw Ang Melody 
On July 29,  MNL48 released a new song "Ikaw ang Melody" as a translated version to AKB48's "Kimi wa Melody". A total of eight members of MNL48 will be flying to Shanghai, China for the AKB48 Group Asia Festival 2019, to be held at the National Exhibition and Convention Center on August 24. They will join AKB48 themselves, AKB48's Team SH and Team TP, and their other international sister groups based in Thailand, Indonesia, and Vietnam. This is the second time MNL48 will be performing abroad, with the first being in the AKB48 Asia Festival in Bangkok last January. Their performance of their acapella rendition of their single, "365 Araw ng Eroplanong Papel." then went viral on twitter.

On September 4, 2019, Ashley Cloud Garcia a member Team L announced her graduation from MNL48 making "Ikaw ang Melody" her last single from the group. After two days, the promotion of Kenkyuusei member Frances Therese Pinlac was announced on MNL48's official website. She will be part of the Next Girls and will also be joining Team L correspondingly.

On October 4, the group was unveiled as a new Kapamilya as they signed an exclusive contract with ABS-CBN together with K-pop girl group Momoland.

High Tension 
On September 21, the senbatsu members for the group's fifth single was announced in the group's official YouTube channel, in which Gabb Skribikin of Team L will be the center. The following month on October 19, the main title of the single was announced. The fifth single track is called High Tension, a cover of AKB48's 46th single of the same name. On November 5, due to committing several house rule violations Princess Labay of Team MII was officially dismissed from the group, Guinevere Muse was then promoted to Team MII replacing Labay. This is Muse's comeback to the group after being evicted on the last election.

On December 31, the annual "NHK Kouhaku Uta Gassen" featured yet again AKB48 with MNL48 included as well as several members from its official local and international sister groups from Thailand, Vietnam, Indonesia, and India, for a performance of their hit song, "Koisuru Fortune Cookie." Abby Trinidad represented the group as she sang a line of the song in Tagalog. She becomes only the third performer from the Philippines to grace the prestigious "Kohaku Uta Gassen" stage, following Gary Valenciano in 1990 and the band Smokey Mountain in 1991. Some of those included in that years lineup were iconic rockers Kiss, Japan's pop legends Arashi, and K-pop stars Twice.

2020: Third Generation, High Tension, and River 
After committing a major violation, Hallo Hallo Entertainment terminated Daniella Mae Palmero of Team NIV from the group on January 13, she was then replaced by kenkyusei member Karla Dela Paz who was promoted to Team NIV on January 18. On January 25, MNL48 announces the third generation audition to determine who will be promoted to Training and Development Team as candidates for third year members. Its third general election's protocol will be followed through AKB48's General Election, and JKT48's Promotion-Demotion system. For those members who will be included in Top 48, they will be promoted to Teams MII, NIV & L, while for those who are outranked, they will be demoted to Training and Development Team. No force graduations will happen like on the last General Election.

On January 26, Team MII's Faith Shanrae Santiago had her graduation concert at Movie Stars' Cafe, she announced her graduation from the group last December 22, 2019 in their Christmas Mini Concert. Kenkyuusei member Christina Samantha Tagana was promoted to Team MII on the same day as Santiago's replacement . On February 19, the official music video for the group's fifth single "High Tension" was released on MNL48's official YouTube channel. Leaving behind the signature high-school uniforms, the group showed a more grown-up, but still fun-loving image in their fifth single's music video. Since its release, the MV has made its way to YouTube’s trending videos list. Due to Santiago's graduation, she was replaced by Coleen Trinidad on the Music Video.

In lieu with the ongoing COVID-19 crisis, MNL48 members Coleen Trinidad, Sheki Arzaga, and Abby Trinidad together with international members of AKB48 Group joins well-known Asian performers in ‘One Love Asia’ benefit show on May 27. One Love Asia is a charity event presented by YouTube and WebTVAsia that seeks to raise funds in support of UNICEF.

River 
On February 16, during the group's Valentine Mini Concert at Movie Stars Cafe, the group's sixth single title and senbatsu was announced. For the first time in MNL48's history, Gabb Skribikin and Abby Trinidad will be double centers for River, a cover of AKB48's 14th single of the same name. On June 10, in one of MNL48's Kumu livestream, over-all captain Alice de Leon announced that she will join the Senbatsu for River as replacement for Rans Rifol who has then officially graduated from the group on October 20 of the same year.

On November 11, MNL48 released a teaser video for their single, River. But due to undesirable calamities in the Philippines, Hallo Hallo Entertainment released a statement that the release of the music video will be postponed. On November 27, MNL48 premiered the official music video of River. The coupling tracks "Sampung Taon ng Sakura" and "Labrador Retriever" were also released on iTunes, Apple Music and as auto-generated tracks in YouTube Music the same day.

Third general election (2020) 
On March 12, MNL48's Team NIV performed 1! 2! 3! 4! Yoroshiku at audience-free It's Showtime, and they announced that the third general election will be aired at the said program on April 25. Due to COVID-19 pandemic in the Philippines, the voting lines for General Election were extended until October 31. On March 15, the candidates for the third general election was announced, consisting of 62 candidates (44 from first and second generation, 2 from Kenkyuusei, and 16 from third generation). Eligible candidates Rans, Yssa, Lei, and Rowee will not join the Third General Election due to personal reasons. On March 24, third generation aspirant Querubin Gonzalez withdrew the candidacy for official 48 members. Two days later, former Pinoy Big Brother: Otso housemate Jelay Pilones joined the candidacy for the third general election.

On May 18, in the midst of the voting process, Team NIV's Valerie Joyce Daita announced that she will no longer to join the third general election due to personal reasons. Eleven days after, Yiesha Amera Ungad also withdrew her candidacy for the election due to her religion. On June 22, Daryll Matalino also withdrew her candidacy to finish her project as an actress on MNL48 Presents: Chain, following her graduation announcement. On August 4, the remaining second Generation Kenkyuusei members Anne Nicole Casitas and Trisha Labrador was promoted as official members of MNL48 as part of Team NIV.

On September 30, Team NIV Captain Ecka Sibug announced her withdrawal from the Third General Elections and the MNL48 group itself. The same day, MNL48 posted on their official Facebook page that HalloHallo Entertainment (HHE) has decided that for the Third General Elections, the group will become a 36-member girl group, in order to focus more on individual projects and sub-units HHE has slated for the next months.

On October 28, three days before the voting deadline, HHE released a statement that the Third General Election will be announced very soon. On the other hand, the voting period will be extended until November 30. On November 28, Team NIV's Belle delos Reyes withdrew her candidacy to complete the music video of River, leaving the 56 official candidates of the Third General Election.

On November 29, the first preliminary results of the Third General Election was released as of November 28, 6 p.m. PST. First Generation center Sheki leads for center position. Followed by Andi, Ruth, Coleen, Ella, Jem, and Jamie for Kami 7. The first preliminary Top 36 consists of 11 members from Team MII, 10 from Team NIV, 10 from Team L, and 5 from Third Generation aspirant. Few hours after the preliminary result, during her Instagram live, top member Sela Guia formally announced that she will withdraw her candidacy from the third edition of MNL48's General Election and leave the group. After her duties and responsibilities she formally left February the next year, making River her last single as a member of the group. On November 30, few hours before the voting cutoff, the second preliminary results was released as of November 29, 10:30 p.m. PST. Abby overtakes Sheki for the center spot. Followed by Andi, Ruth, Jem, Coleen, and Ella are now the Kami 7. The second preliminary top 36 consists of 11 members each from Team MII and Team NIV, 10 from Team L, and 4 from Third Generation aspirant.

BABY BLUE sub-unit formation 

On September 1, MNL48 announced the formation of BABY BLUE, the group's first-ever sub-unit, in partnership with Tower Records Japan, a major Japanese music retailer. Said sub-unit is formed by MNL48 members Jan Elaurza, Coleen Trinidad and Amy Isidto. Following the announcement, BABY BLUE officially released its debut single titled "Sweet Talking Sugar", and was made available through EGGS, a Japanese digital music subscription service. The single, according to HHE, is an homage to the famed city pop genre, with a modern take via "the R&B and hip-hop genre". An official music video, produced by Carlo Manatad of Plan C, was released on GYAO!, Yahoo Japan's free online streaming site on September 16 and on MNL48's official YouTube channel on the next day.

A second track, "NEGASTAR" was released by the sub-unit officially after they uploaded a sixty-second teaser uploaded on the music subscription service EGGS on November 16. The full track was then uploaded on November 25 and was also made available on mainstream music streaming platforms like iTunes and Spotify.

Release of first-ever original track "HASHLOVE" 
On December 23, MNL48 premiered its first-ever original song called "HASHLOVE", a pop/R&B song centered around the theme of Christmas celebrations. The track was performed by select members namely Shekinah Arzaga, Frances Pinlac, Cole Somera, Jamie Alberto, Yzabel Divinagracia, Ruth Lingat and Brei Binuya. "HASHLOVE" is composed by Filipino music producer Jungee Marcelo.

2021: Third General Election Conclusion 
On February 1, 2021, MNL48 simultaneously announced through their social media channels of the new schedules of the announcement of the Third General Election results. Set across three Saturdays of February and will be announced on the noontime show "It's Showtime", February 6 will be the announcement of the 48 candidates that will make through the cut, February 13 will be the ranking from Rank 48 to Rank 17, to which both will be announced on the It’s Showtime “Online U” segment. Finally, the "senbatsu" lineup, which is Rank 16 to Rank 1, will be announced on February 20. On February 6, members Aly Padillo and Ice Bozon announced their departure from MNL48.

The Third General Election concluded with Team NIV Abby Trinidad hailed as the new center of the Third Generation, which was announced live on the noontime show "It's Showtime" on February 20, 2021. The "senbatsu" lineup was completed by the following in rank order: Sheki Arzaga, Jamie Alberto, Ruth Lingat, Ella Amat, Jan Elaurza, Andi Garcia, Jem Caldejon, Yzabel Divinagracia, Gabb Skribikin, Alice De Leon, Princess Briquillo, Lara Layar, Coleen Trinidad, Thea Itona and Tin Coloso.

Following the election, the 'senbatsu' lineup, as well as other select new members from the Third Generation aspirants, were given the chance to express their thoughts during the election period in a media conference hosted by entertainment reporter MJ Felipe last February 22. Throughout the interview, members discussed potential hints for the group's upcoming single, as well as interest in collaborating with fellow P-pop artists, where they dismissed statements of 'competition within the P-pop scene.

On February 25, members Laney Sañosa and Karla dela Paz announced that they will be graduating from MNL48.

On February 27, Philippine Pro Gaming League announced that it is giving fans a chance to virtually meet and play along with select members of the group namely Cole Somera, Abby Trinidad, Sheki Arzaga, Gabb Skribikin, and Coleen Trinidad. While the match is set to play off on March 8, PPGL announced that the event premiere is slated on March 27.

On March 17, Team MII's Sheki Arzaga was promoted as MNL48's new overall captain, taking over fellow Team MII's Alice de Leon. The same day, an announcement was also made that MNL48 will be joining fellow P-pop groups BINI and BGYO, as well as artists from Star Magic and Star Hunt in an upcoming live stream on March 19. This is after ABS-CBN and Filipino live streaming platform Kumu have entered into a new partnership for greater exposure of ABS-CBN talents and artists.

On December 18, MNL48 held its first on-site event to allow live audiences since the onset of the COVID-19 pandemic in the country, with Novotel Manila Araneta City as their venue. On the same day, MNL48 announced the upcoming seventh single No Way Man.

2022: No Way Man and P-Pop Rise 
MNL48’s Team Padayon consisting of Jem, Kath, Klaire, Miho, and Yzabel won the Pokémon UNITE AKB48 Group Invitational at the Pokémon Battle Festival Asia 2021 by ESL Asia. They claimed the title after defeating BNK48’s Yummy Remote 3-1 in the Grand Finals last January 16, 2022. With this win, MNL48’s Team Padayon became the first Filipino music idol group to win in an international esports competition.

On April 1, a year after their third General Election, MNL48 released the music video of their seventh single titled “No Way Man”. It is the Philippine version of AKB48’s 54th single of the same name. The almost seven-minute music video has garnered more than 43,000 views 12 hours after its release. It also occupied spots in Top 5 trending topics in the Philippines on Twitter. Meanwhile, MNL48 graced the first-ever Pinoy Pop Convention (PPOPCON) in the country, the P-Pop Con 2022. The concert kicked off at the New Frontier Theater on April 9, while the much-anticipated concert took place in the Big Dome the next day, April 10. Aside from MNL48, other groups that attended the PPOPCON are BGYO, BINI, SB19, Alamat, Press Hit Play, and 4th Impact.

On May 22, MNL48 performed with their Japanese sister group AKB48 and other Japanese groups, at the City Football Station inside the Tochigi City General Sports Park, Japan. They took part in the Manny Pacquiao Charity Marathon Suzuki 2022, that was organized by the Manny Pacquiao Foundation, led by the Filipino boxing champion himself. MNL48 members Amy and Coleen represented the group in the said event.

On July 15, A total of 18 P-POP acts including MNL48 joined forces for the first-ever Tugatog: Filipino Music Festival, at the SM Mall of Asia Arena in Pasay City. This music festical was produced by Ant Savvy Creatives, Inc. and co-presented by KUMU, realme, and powered by Ulam Mama. The line-up also includes other P-Pop groups like BGYO, BINI, ALAMAT, PPOP Generation, VXON, LITZ, first.One, Press Hit Play, Dione, Calista, R Rules, G22, DAYDREAM, and YARA. Fifteen members of MNL48 started the music festival as they march their way to the stage and performed their sixth single "River." The group also performed the songs "Pag-ibig Fortune Cookie" and "Ikaw Ang Melody" onstage, and during the group's performance of their song "365 Araw ng Eroplanong Papel", the concert hall was filled with paper plains as fans started flying them on air. MNL48 also collaborated with BGYO and performed a mash-up version of their songs "High Tension" and "Sabay."

On August 3, Hallo Hallo Entertainment announced that MNL48 is set to embark on a nationwide tour, dubbed as “The Breakthrough: MNL48 No Way Man Nationwide Tour 2022 ,” the touring show will feature MNL48’s seventh single, “No Way Man.” in partnership with Robinsons Malls. “The Breakthrough” follows MNL48’s mall shows, and the group’s consecutive live performances at the music festivals P-Pop Con in April and Tugatog in July.

On October 29, MNL48 went to Jakarta, Indonesia to team up with its sibling group, JKT48. In the latter’s home country, the group went as guest performers for TikTok Indonesia’s For You Stage. They performed back-to-back, then together, three of their hits. JKT48 first took the stage with “Heavy Rotation,” followed by MNL48’s seventh single “No Way Man.” The two groups then joined forces for the Indonesian and Filipino versions of “Koi Suru Fortune Cookie.” They will performed alongside Indonesian boyband UN1TY, and South Korean icon PSY. The bonding didn’t stop there, as JKT48 toured MNL48 in their own group theater.

On December 21, MNL48 captain Sheki released her first solo single Tell Me under Vernalossom.

Members

Filmography

Discography

Concert tours

Awards and nominations

MNL48 Theater

Theater 
The , is where MNL48 will hold their performances.

The MNL48 Theater is situated in the Eton Centris Mall along Quezon Avenue, Quezon City, Metro Manila, with the theater on its ground floor.

Theater Stage 

On December 10, 2019, MNL48 announced their first theater show, Party ga Hajimaru yo (Tara na Party) which was then held on January 18, 2020.

References

External links 
 

 
AKB48 Group
Filipino girl groups
Filipino pop music groups
Musical groups from Manila
Musical groups established in 2018
2018 establishments in the Philippines
Star Music artists